Baqiao District is one of 11 districts of the prefecture-level city of Xi'an, the capital of Shaanxi Province, Northwest China. The district borders Gaoling District to the north, Lintong District to the northeast, Chang'an District to the southeast, Yanta and Xincheng Districts to the west, and Weiyang District to the northwest.

History 
Baqiao District was established in 1954, and had jurisdiction over five townships: Donggaoqiao, Egongdian, Shuigou, Yongfeng, and Xinglin. In 1957, the former Changle District was merged into Baqiao.

The district had a population of 402,163 in the Fourth Chinese Census, a population of 494,084 in the Fifth Chinese Census, and a population of 595,124 in the Sixth Chinese Census.

Administrative divisions 
Baqiao District has nine subdistricts. These subdistricts are further divided into 72 residential communities and 76 administrative villages.

Economy 
As of 2019, the district's GDP totaled ¥48.919 billion, an 8.3% increase from the previous year. Of this, ¥1.923 billion came from the district's primary sector, ¥13.773 billion came from the district's secondary sector, and the remaining ¥33.223 billion came from the district's tertiary sector.

Education 
The district is home to the PLA Rocket Force University of Engineering.

Transportation

Road 
National Highway 310 and National Highway 312 pass through the district, as well as the G5 Expressway and the G30 Expressway.

Rail 

The Longhai railway and the Xi'an–Ankang railway both pass through Baqiao District.

Cultural sights 
The district is the burial place of a number of Chinese emperors.

References

External links

Districts of Xi'an